The brown-eared bulbul (Hypsipetes amaurotis) is a medium-sized bulbul native to eastern Asia. It is extremely common within the northern parts of its range and can be found from southern Sakhalin to the northern Philippines.

Taxonomy and systematics
The brown-eared bulbul was originally described in the genus Turdus. Later, some authorities placed it in the genus Ixos  and then the genus Microscelis, before being re-classified to Hypsipetes in 2010. Alternate names for the brown-eared bulbul include the Asian brown-eared bulbul, chestnut-eared bulbul, and Eurasian brown-eared bulbul.

Subspecies
Twelve subspecies are currently recognized:
 Japanese brown-eared bulbul (H. a. amaurotis) – (Temminck, 1830): Also named the Japanese chestnut-eared bulbul. Found on southern Sakhalin, Japan and South Korea
 H. a. matchiae – (Momiyama, 1923): Found on southern Kyushu, Japan
 H. a. ogawae – Hartert, 1907: Found on northern Ryukyu Islands
 H. a. pryeri – Stejneger, 1887: Found on central Ryukyu Islands
 H. a. stejnegeri – Hartert, 1907: Found on southern Ryukyu Islands
 H. a. squamiceps – (Kittlitz, 1830): Originally described as a separate species in the genus Oriolus. Found on the Bonin Islands.
 H. a. magnirostris – Hartert, 1905: Found on the Volcano Islands 
 H. a. borodinonis – (Kuroda, 1923): Found on the Borodino Islands 
 Taiwan brown-eared bulbul (H. a. nagamichii) – Rand & Deignan, 1960: Also named the Taiwan chestnut-eared bulbul. Found on Taiwan and Orchid Island (Lanyu Island).
 H. a. batanensis – Mearns, 1907: Found on Batan, Ivuhos, Sabtang, Babuyan and Claro (extreme northern Philippines) 
 H. a. fugensis – Ogilvie-Grant, 1895: Found on Dalupiri, Calayan and Fuga Island (north of Luzon in northern Philippines)
 H. a. camiguinensis – McGregor, 1907: Found on Camiguin Island  (north of Luzon in northern Philippines)

Description

While they prefer forested areas, they readily adapt to urban and rural environments, and their noisy squeaking calls are a familiar sound in most areas of Japan. One author described the song of the brown-eared bulbul as "one of the most unattractive noises made by any bird".

Distribution and habitat
The brown-eared bulbul is common in a very large range that includes the Russian Far East (including Sakhalin), northeastern China, the Korean Peninsula, and Japan, south to Taiwan and the Babuyan and Batanes island chains in the north of the Philippines.

Historically, brown-eared bulbuls were migratory birds moving to the southern parts of their range in winter, but they have taken advantage of changes in crops and farming practices in recent decades to overwinter in areas farther north than previously possible. Most brown-eared bulbuls still move south in winter, often forming huge flocks during migration. They are considered agricultural pests in some areas of Japan where they may invade orchards and damage crops such as cabbages, cauliflowers and spinach.

Behaviour

Breeding
Around five eggs are laid by the female, which then incubates them. Brown-eared bulbuls are frequently parasitized by cuckoos, whose chicks will push bulbul eggs and chicks out of the nest.

Feeding
In summer, brown-eared bulbuls primarily feed on insects, while they mostly take fruits and seeds in the fall and winter. At this time, they also feed on the nectar from Camellia flowers, becoming dusted with yellow pollen in the process. In this way they help to pollinate the flowers at a time of year when there are few insect pollinators around.

Diseases
H. amaurotis is a host for the haemosporidian disease Haemoproteus philippinensis (Haemoproteus (Parahaemoproteus) philippinensis).

References

Further reading
  Available at Gallica (search for "Gray")

External links

 Brown-eared bulbul at Avibase
 Damage to Crops by Birds study at Okinawa University

brown-eared bulbul
Birds of Japan
Birds of Korea
Birds of Taiwan
brown-eared bulbul
Taxa named by Coenraad Jacob Temminck